In enzymology, an isoflavone 4'-O-methyltransferase is an enzyme that catalyzes the chemical reaction

S-adenosyl-L-methionine + an isoflavone  S-adenosyl-L-homocysteine + a 4'-O-methylisoflavone

Thus, the two substrates of this enzyme are S-adenosyl methionine and isoflavone, whereas its two products are S-adenosylhomocysteine and 4'-O-methylisoflavone.

This enzyme belongs to the family of transferases, specifically those transferring one-carbon group methyltransferases.  The systematic name of this enzyme class is S-adenosyl-L-methionine:isoflavone 4'-O-methyltransferase. Other names in common use include 4'-hydroxyisoflavone methyltransferase, isoflavone methyltransferase, and isoflavone O-methyltransferase.  This enzyme participates in isoflavonoid biosynthesis.

References 

 

EC 2.1.1
Enzymes of unknown structure
Isoflavonoids metabolism
O-methylated flavonoids metabolism